Timothy Joseph Hill (born May 21, 1958) is an American animator, film director, screenwriter, voice actor and producer.

Career

Hill began his career in the 1990s as a television writer, director and storyboard artist for Rocko's Modern Life (with Stephen Hillenburg), Exit 57, KaBlam!, SpongeBob SquarePants and Kenny the Shark. He also created the KaBlam! skit Action League Now!!

Hill directed the films Muppets from Space, Max Keeble's Big Move, Garfield: A Tail of Two Kitties, Alvin and the Chipmunks, and Hop. Hill was a screenwriter for The SpongeBob SquarePants Movie. He later directed another SpongeBob film The SpongeBob Movie: Sponge on the Run''.

Personal life
Hill has been married to actress Veronica Alicino, whom he frequently casts in minor roles in his films, since June 24, 1997. He is the nephew of director George Roy Hill.

Filmography
Film

Television

Awards and nominations

References

External links

American film directors
American television writers
American storyboard artists
American male television writers
Living people
Place of birth missing (living people)
1958 births